Ferreiro is a surname of Galician origin, equivalent to English Smith. Notable people with the surname include:

David Ferreiro
Roberto Ferreiro
Iván Ferreiro
Celso Emilio Ferreiro
Franco Ferreiro
Mario Aníbal Ferreiro
Alfredo Mario Ferreiro
Benn Ferriero
David Ferriero
Martín Ferreiro

Spanish-language surnames